"World in Union" is a theme song for the Rugby World Cup. Its melody is "Thaxted", from the middle section of "Jupiter, the Bringer of Jollity", a movement from Gustav Holst's The Planets, and was originally adapted by Holst for its use in the British/Anglican patriotic hymn, "I Vow to Thee, My Country", using words by Sir Cecil Spring Rice.

Kiri Te Kanawa version

New Zealand operatic soprano Kiri Te Kanawa recorded the first version of this song for the 1991 Rugby World Cup. Her version peaked at  4 on the UK Singles Chart, No. 5 in Ireland, and No. 10 in New Zealand.

Charts

Weekly charts

Year-end charts

Shirley Bassey and Bryn Terfel version

Shirley Bassey and Bryn Terfel released a version of the song on 11 October 1999. It was mimed live by at the opening of the series in June 1999, with Bassey wearing a gown designed on the Welsh flag. Three versions are featured on the single: a duet with Bassey and Terfel, Bassey's solo version and a version which features the choirs only. The duet version is performed partially in Welsh by Terfel. The official video was filmed at the Millennium Stadium, Cardiff and features various other Welsh landscapes. The single reached No. 35 on the UK Singles Chart in October 1999.

UK 3 track maxi CD single 
 "World in Union" (Duet: Bryn Terfel and Shirley Bassey) – 3:42
 "World in Union" (Shirley Bassey) – 3:45
 "World in Union" (Welsh Mountain Mix) – 3:45

Personnel
 Shirley Bassey – vocal (tracks 1 and 2)
 Bryn Terfel – vocal (track 1)
 The Black Mountain Male Chorus – choir (all tracks)
 The Morriston Rugby Club Choir – choir (all tracks)
 Robert Fardell and Charlie Skarbek – backing singers (track 2)
 The City of Prague Philharmonic Orchestra – orchestra
 Llio Rhydderch – Welsh triple harp
 Troy Donockley – uilleann pipes
 David Thomas – drums
 Simon Hale – orchestral arrangements
 Tim Rhys-Evans and D. Huw Rees – choral arrangements

Hayley Westenra version

The official album of the 2011 Rugby World Cup in New Zealand was launched on 9 August by New Zealand soprano Hayley Westenra. It was released by Universal Music on 26 August, and included 22 tracks recorded by classical artists. Westenra had not only recorded the song in English and Māori, as heard on this album, but also in French, Italian, and Japanese. It got No. 1 album position on the Classical Compilation Albums Chart of Official Charts as well as the Classic FM chart after releasing in UK.

The Official Album track listing
 World In Union – Hayley Westenra
 Swing Low '99 – Arr. C. Skarbek/ T.R. Evans – Russell Watson, Royal Choral Society
 Land of My Fathers – Fron Male Voice Choir
 Ireland's Call – Brian Kennedy, Paul Byrom
 Scottish Medley – Royal Scots Dragoon Guards
 Jerusalem – The Coldstream Guards Band, Alfie Boe
 Glorious – Mary-Jess
 Now's The Time – Luigi Corvi
 Calon Lan – Katherine Jenkins
 O Verona – Only Men Aloud
 Pokarekare Ana – Hayley Westenra, Francois Rive, Robbie McIntosh, Metro Voices, Te Tau Choir, Jenny O'Grady, Royal Philharmonic Orchestra, Ian Dean
 Waltzing Matilda – André Rieu, Mirusia Louwerse
 We'll keep a welcome – Bryn Terfel, Orchestra of the Welsh National Opera, Gareth Jones, The Black Mountain Choir, The Risca Choir
 Nkosi Sikelel'i Afrika – Kenyan Boys Choir
 Men of Harlech – Fron Male Voice Choir
 God Defend New Zealand – Hayley Westenra
 The Fields Of Athenry – Máiréad Carlin
 Cwm Rhondda – Bryn Terfel, Orchestra of the Welsh National Opera, Gareth Jones, The Black Mountain Choir, The Risca Choir
 La Marseillaise – Roberto Alagna
 Swing Low – All Angels
 World In Union (English / Māori) – Hayley Westenra
 Kakari (Haka 2011) – Qube

Paloma Faith version

R&B singer Paloma Faith was selected to record the song as the official 2015 Rugby World Cup anthem. Her rendition of the song was used on ITV's Rugby World Cup coverage in the opening titles and during advert breaks, a decision that was greeted negatively by some viewers. A petition to have the song removed was set up by viral marketing expert Jonathan Wilson and received over 10,000 signatures. The petition was featured on the front page of UK newspaper The Daily Telegraph.

Kiyoe Yoshioka version
For the 2019 Rugby World Cup, the song was recorded by Japanese singer Kiyoe Yoshioka. This was also included on her debut solo album Utairo.

ITV used a version recorded by Emeli Sandé for their 2019 World Cup coverage.

Invictus

"World in Union" features in the film Invictus which is based on the events surrounding the 1995 Rugby World Cup in South Africa. The original 1995 World Cup recording by PJ Powers and Ladysmith Black Mambazo is used at the end of the final match. A second recording made for the movie by Yollandi Nortjie and Overtone is played during the closing credits.

References

External links
2007 All-Star version of the song, featuring singers from some of the major rugby-playing nations including New Zealander Hayley Westenra, Italian Roberto Alagna, Welsh singers Katherine Jenkins, Elin Manahan Thomas, Aled Jones and Bryn Terfel, English singers Lesley Garrett and Jonathan Ansell, the British group All Angels and the Australian ensemble The Ten Tenors.

1991 songs
1991 singles
1995 songs
1995 singles
1999 songs
1999 singles
2003 songs
2003 singles
2007 songs
2007 singles
2011 songs
2011 singles
2015 songs
2015 singles
2019 songs
2019 singles
2023 songs
 2023 singles
Sports television theme songs
Sports events official songs and anthems
Rugby World Cup
Shirley Bassey songs
Anthems of organizations